H.Con.Res.57/Treasure Box (also referred to as HR57 I–IV or HR57 Treasure Box) is a live, 4-CD album by multi-instrumentalist Alan Silva. It was recorded on May 24 and 27, 2001, at the Uncool Festival in Poschiavo, Switzerland, and was released in 2003 in limited quantities by Eremite Records. On the album, Silva is joined by a large ensemble known as the Celestrial Communication Orchestra. The performances marked the first occasion on which Silva's choice of musicians was completely unrestricted in terms of budget or  geography.

The title refers to a 1987 United States House of Representatives resolution sponsored by Congressman John Conyers Jr of Michigan "respecting the designation of jazz as a rare and valuable national American treasure." The text of the resolution was recited at both concerts by Ijeoma Thomas.

The four CDs are housed in boxes that were assembled and embellished by hand, and that also contain reproductions of art work and booklets featuring photos and essays.

Reception

In a review for AllMusic, Thom Jurek called the album "an exemplary document of Alan Silva's consummate skill as a composer, big band leader, arranger, and improviser." He singled out the May 24 performance of "Amplitude" for praise, acknowledging its "nearly frightening power and beauty," and writing: "aural divisions and arbitrary categories implode and then dissolve. Jazz and classical, musically tempered, and free improvisation become part of something much larger, something sublimely connected to a force outside itself, and perhaps even outside the realm of music." He concluded: "This set... is worth its weight in gold and should be referred to continually in the jazz canon for its revelatory control and exploration."

The authors of the Penguin Guide to Jazz Recordings awarded the album 4 stars, but cautioned that they found the music "aurally 'difficult,' sometimes frustrating." They wrote: "Describing the music is almost impossible. So large are the sections of HR57 in its various incarnations that any generalization is impossible, but the sound has a strong, almost primitive quality which perhaps recalls Silva's association with Albert Ayler in his later days... Silva isn't so very far from the great bandleaders of a later generation. If one can imagine the Albert Ayler group guesting with the Stan Kenton band, that isn't very far from reality... As an assertion of jazz's authority and position in American culture, these four hours of music are unequalled."

Grego Edwards, writing for All About Jazz, commented: "This is in all a vibrant, exalting, exuberant, flaming conflagration of voices, a gathering of the free tribe, a melding of the many ultra-individual voices into a massively powerful whole. The compositional-conductional element brings cohesion and structure points into what otherwise could have been chaos. And the elements do so in ways that are pure Alan Silva. Brilliant... If you are a serious student of the avant arts, you owe it to yourself to study (and enjoy) what Alan and the master musicians are up to here. It's a monumental achievement."

Track listing
Composed by Alan Silva.

Disc 1
 "Amplitude I" – 4:50
 "Amplitude II" – 21:30
 "Amplitude III" – 20:14
 "Amplitude IV" – 15:41

Disc 2
 "HR57 I" – 23:48
 "HR57 II" – 15:50
 "What Is Your Name?" – 9:35

Disc 3
 "Amplitude I" – 15:43
 "Amplitude II" – 10:46
 "HR57 I" – 15:41
 "HR57 II" – 18:56

Disc 4
 "HR57 III" – 31:14
 "Soon" – 26:30
 "What Is Your Name?" – 8:10

 Recorded at the Uncool Festival in Poschiavo, Switzerland. Discs 1 and 2 recorded on May 24, 2001. Discs 3 and 4 recorded on May 27, 2001.

Personnel
 Alan Silva – synthesizer, conductor
 Marshall Allen – alto saxophone, flute
 Kidd Jordan – tenor saxophone
 Daniel Carter – tenor saxophone, alto saxophone, B♭ clarinet, flute, trumpet
 Sabir Mateen – tenor saxophone, alto saxophone, clarinet, flute
 Francis Wong – tenor saxophone, flute
 J. D. Parran – baritone saxophone, clarinet, flute
 Oluyemi Thomas – bass clarinet, C melody saxophone, flute
 Karen Borca – bassoon
 Baikida Carroll – trumpet, flugelhorn
 Roy Campbell Jr. – trumpet, flugelhorn
 Itaru Oki – trumpet
 Johannes Bauer – trombone
 Joseph Bowie – trombone
 Steve Swell – trombone
 William Lowe – bass trombone, tuba
 Joe Daley – tuba, tenor horn
 Bobby Few – piano
 Wilber Morris – bass
 William Parker – bass
 Jackson Krall – drums
 Warren Smith – drums
 Ijeoma Thomas – vocals

References

2003 live albums
Alan Silva live albums
Eremite Records live albums
Live free jazz albums